Petaloconchus nigricans is a species of sea snail, a marine gastropod mollusk in the family Vermetidae, the worm snails or worm shells.

Distribution

Description 
The maximum recorded shell length is 60 mm.

References

External links

Vermetidae
Gastropods described in 1884